The Khao Khiao Massif  is a moderately high mountain range near Chonburi, eastern Thailand. This massif has the last substantial forested zone in Chonburi Province, a region that is much affected by urbanization and other forms of human intervention and land degradation.

Khao Khiao is the mountain area closest to Bangkok, rising about 70 km to the southeast of the capital.

Description
The mountains of the massif are smooth and forested. They are partly covered with dry and moist broadleaf forest in the lower ranges.

The Khao Khiao Massif rises east of the Motorway 7 to Pattaya and Rayong.

Protected area
The Khao Khiao – Khao Chomphu Wildlife Sanctuary is a protected area in the massif. Founded in 1974, it is an IUCN Category IV wildlife sanctuary, measuring 145 km2 in area.

The Khao Kheow Open Zoo is at the foot of the mountain massif on its southern side.

See also
List of mountains in Thailand

References

External links
เขตรักษาพันธุ์สัตว์ป่าเขาเขียว-เขาชมภู่ (Thai)
Wildlife sanctuaries of Thailand

Mountain ranges of Thailand
Geography of Chonburi province